John Buttery (21 December 1814 – 5 December 1873) was an English first-class cricketer active 1843–52 who played for Nottinghamshire and Manchester. He was born and died in Nottingham.

References

1814 births
1873 deaths
English cricketers
Nottinghamshire cricketers
Manchester Cricket Club cricketers
Nottingham Cricket Club cricketers
Players of Nottinghamshire cricketers
Lancashire cricketers